Jan Růžička (born February 23, 1997) is a Czech ice hockey goaltender. He is currently playing with BK Mladá Boleslav of the Czech Extraliga.

Růžička made his Czech Extraliga debut playing two games with BK Mladá Boleslav during the 2014–15 Czech Extraliga season.

Career statistics

Regular season and playoffs

References

External links

1997 births
Living people
Czech ice hockey goaltenders
BK Mladá Boleslav players
Sportspeople from Mladá Boleslav
Des Moines Buccaneers players
HC Slavia Praha players
HC Slovan Ústečtí Lvi players
Czech expatriate ice hockey players in the United States